The Boston College Eagles represented Boston College in Women's Hockey East Association play during the 2020–21 NCAA Division I women's ice hockey season. The program qualified for the 2021 NCAA National Collegiate Women's Ice Hockey Tournament, ranking as the #6 seed. On January 31, 2021, it marked the 500th game together at BC for head coach Katie Crowley and associate head coach Courtney Kennedy.

In the aftermath of the Frozen Four, it was announced that the Eagles were invited to participate in the Smashville NCAA Women's Hockey Showcase this November at the Ford Ice Center, practice facility of the NHL’s Nashville Predators.
Also participating in the tournament will be Division I women's hockey programs Colgate, Mercyhurst and Minnesota.

Offseason

Recruiting

Regular season

Standings

Schedule

|-
!colspan=12 style="  "| Regular Season
|-

|-
!colspan=12 style="  "| Hockey East Tournament
|-

|-
!colspan=12 style="  "| NCAA Tournament
|-

Roster

2020–21 Eagles

Awards and honors
Cayla Barnes, 2020-21 Second Team CCM/AHCA All-American
Alexie Guay, Hockey East Defensive Player of the Week (awarded January 18, 2021)
Gaby Roy, 2021 Hockey East All-Rookie Team
 Gaby Roy, Hockey Commissioners Association Women’s Player of the Month (November 2020) 
Natalie Tulchinsky, Hockey East Rookie of the Week (awarded February 1, 2021)

References

Boston College
Boston College Eagles women's ice hockey seasons
Boston College Eagles women's ice hockey season
Boston College Eagles women's ice hockey season
Boston College Eagles women's ice hockey season
Boston College Eagles women's ice hockey season